Prionospio aucklandica is a spionid worm. Prionospio aucklandica is distributed throughout New Zealand.

References 

Worms of New Zealand
Canalipalpata